Aurora Cave is a limestone cave, part of the Te Ana-au Caves in Fiordland, in the South Island of New Zealand on the western side of a deep glacial trough containing Lake Te Anau. Aurora Cave is separated by a sump from Te Ana-au Cave (a tourist cave). The cave has been formed by the Tunnel Burn, which drains from Lake Orbell in the Takahe valley. Aurora Cave is 267 metres deep and 6 km. long. Around 1988 a Sub Fossils of an extinct species of Frog were discovered. It was named the Aurora Frog (Leiopelma auroraensis)

References

Caves of New Zealand
Landforms of Fiordland